The first North American Basketball League (NABL) was an American professional basketball league that played from 1964 to 1968. The league played four full seasons,  until the league folded after the 1967–1968 season.

History
The North American Basketball League began play in 1964–1965 with five charter franchises, some of whom had been members of the Midwest Professional Basketball League from 1961 to 1964. The Chicago Bombers, Grand Rapids Tackers, Muskegon Panthers, Pontiac Nationals and Twin City Sailors began play in 1964 as charter members. The Chicago and Grand Rapids franchises had been members of the MWL.

In 1965–1966, the Holland Carvers replaced the Pontiac Nationals and the North American Basketball League remained at five teams.

The 1966–1967 North American Basketball League expanded from five to eight teams, adding the Battle Creek Braves, Columbus Comets and Lansing Capitals franchises.

In 1967–1968 the North American Basketball League lost the Muskegon Panthers and the Twin City Sailors teams. Pontiac returned to play and the league played in two divisions. Columbus, Battle Creek, Lansing and Pontiac were the Eastern Division. Chicago, Grand Rapids and Holland comprised the Western Division.

Chicago finished last in each of the four seasons, with Grand Rapids taking three of the four league championships. Porter Meriwether
(Chicago) led the league in Scoring in the first three seasons, averaging 28.1, 28.3 and 29.9 points. Art Crump (Battle Creek) averaged 29.6 in 1967–68 to lead the league.

American Basketball League Franchises (1964–68)

 Battle Creek Braves (1964–1968)
 Chicago Bombers (1964–1968)
 Columbus Comets (1964–1968)
 Grand Rapids Tackers (1964–1968)
 Holland Carvers (1965–1968)
 Lansing Capitals (1965–1968)
 Muskegon Panthers (1964–1967)
 Pontiac Nationals  (1964–65, 1967–1968)
 Twin City Sailors (1964–1967)

Notable alumni

 Bud Acton, Twin Cities
 M. C. Burton Jr., Grand Rapids
 Bill Chmielewski, Muskegon, Battle Creek
 Gary Bradds, Twin Cities, Columbus
 Bill Buntin, Twin Cities
 Ed Burton, Muskegon 
 Larry Comley, Twin Cities 
 Johnny Cox Holland, Battle Creek, Muskegon
 Jimmy Darrow, Coach, Muskegon
 Bill Dinwiddie, Columbus
 Sonny Dove, Pontiac
 Ron Dunlap, Chicago
 Boo Ellis, Chicago
 Charles Hardnett, Grand Rapids
 Jerry Harkness, Twin Cities
 Bob Hogsett, Lansing
 Les Hunter, Twin Cities
 Ollie Johnson, Grand Rapids 
 Stew Johnson, Twin Cities
 Willie Jones, Grand Rapids 
 Arvesta Kelly, Columbus
 Jim Ligon, Holland
 Lonnie Lynn, Columbus
 Billy McGill, Grand Rapids, Holland 
 Guy Manning, Battle Creek 
 Nick Mantis, Grand Rapids 
 Porter Meriwether, Chicago
 Gene Michael, Columbus
 Mel Nowell, Muskegon, Columbus
 Bob Pelkington, Muskegon
 Bill Reigel Coach, Holland, 
 Joe Roberts, Muskegon, Columbus 
 Tom Thacker, Muskegon 
 Skip Thoren, Twin Cities
 Horace Walker, Lansing 
 Jim Ware,  Muskegon
 Bob Wilkinson, Coach, Grand Rapids 
 Bob Woollard, Twin Cities

References

External links
 Association for Professional Basketball Research NORTH AMERICAN BASKETBALL LEAGUE 1964–65 TO 1967–68

Defunct basketball leagues in the United States
Sports leagues established in 1964
Sports leagues disestablished in 1968
1964 establishments in the United States
1968 disestablishments in the United States